"Amnesia" is a song by British MC Skepta. It was released on 27 February 2011 in the United Kingdom. It is the fifth single released Skepta's third album Doin' It Again. It reached number 164 on the UK Singles Chart.

Background
The track was premiered on Westwood's Radio 1 show on 22 January 2011. It was released a Digital download on 27 February 2011.

Track listings

Music video
The music video for "Amnesia" premiered on 22 January 2010 on YouTube. The video currently has over 3,600,000 views.

Personnel
 Lead vocals – Skepta
 Producers – Bassboy 
 Lyrics – J. Adenuga
 Label: All Around the World

Chart performance

Weekly charts

Release history

References

2011 singles
Skepta songs
2010 songs
All Around the World Productions singles
Songs written by Skepta
Songs about alcohol